Fabio Senhorinho Silva (born January 29, 1977) is a former Brazilian footballer who played in the Segunda Liga, Canadian Professional Soccer League, and in the Brazilian Football Leagues.

Playing career 
Silva began his career in his native Brazil with the Corinthians, from where he played from 1995 till 1996. In 2003, he went abroad to Canada to sign with the Toronto Supra of the Canadian Professional Soccer League. During his tenure with Toronto he had an impressive run with the organization, which brought the attention of Portimonense S.C. of the Segunda Liga.  With Portimonense he appeared in 25 matches. He returned to the Toronto Supra for the 2004 season, where he helped Toronto achieve a ten-game undefeated streak.  He help Toronto claim their first piece of silverware by clinching the Eastern Conference title, and finished first in the overall league standings. In the playoffs the Supra faced the Vaughan Shooters, but were eliminated by a score of 4-1. In 2007, he returned to Brazil to sign with Jabaquara Atlético Clube.

References 

Living people
1977 births
Brazilian footballers
Canadian Soccer League (1998–present) players
Sport Club Corinthians Paulista players
Jabaquara Atlético Clube players
Portimonense S.C. players
SC Toronto players
Liga Portugal 2 players
Association football midfielders
Footballers from São Paulo